Schifferstadt (Schiffaschdad, or Schiwwerschdadt) is a town in the Rhein-Pfalz-Kreis, in Rhineland-Palatinate, Germany. If not including Ludwigshafen (the district free city that is the capital of Rhein-Pfalz-Kreis), Schifferstadt is the only urban municipality in the Rhein-Pfalz-Kreis.

It is situated approximately 12 km southwest of Ludwigshafen and 6 km northwest of Speyer.

History 
In 1835 the Golden Hat of Schifferstadt was found nearby, the oldest of four known hats of that kind, dated to 1400-1300 BC.

Mayors
 1945–1946: Arnulf Kaufmann
 1946–1949: Valentin Stahl (CDU)
 1949–1971: Adam Teutsch (CDU)
 1971–1975: Theo Magin (CDU), born 1932
 1975–1995: Josef Sold (CDU)
 1995–2003: Edwin Mayer (CDU)
 2003–2011: Klaus Sattel (FWG)
 since 2011: Ilona Volk (The Greens), born 1963, first green mayor in Rhineland-Palatinate

Population development

Coat of arms 
The blazon of the coat of arms of Schifferstadt is: „In Blau ein stilisiertes goldenes Schiff mit vorne angelehntem, aufrechtem goldenem Ruder, daraus wachsend ein silbernes Kreuz.“ “In blue a stylized golden ship, with an upright golden oar, and a silver cross”

Town twinning 
  Aichach (Germany)
  Frederick (US)
  Löbejün (Germany)

Personalities

Honorary citizen 

 1969: Wilfried Dietrich (1933-1992), Olympic champion in wrestling, called the  Crane of Schifferstadt "

Sons and daughters of the city 

 Franz Funk (1905-1987), musician, composer, arranger and composer 
 Heinz Hoffmann (1923-1999), physician, pedagogue and engineer
 Philip Jalalpoor (born 1993), basketball player
 Stefan Jambo (born 1958), footballer
 Bernd Gerber (born 1961), footballer

People who have worked in the city 
 Hieronymus Bock (1498-1554), botanist and theologian, lived on a temporary basis
 Albert Ferber (1923-2010), German semi-heavyweight champion (Wrestling)
 Hans-Jürgen Veil (born 1946), Olympic silver medal winner 1972 in the wrestling (VfK Schifferstadt)
 Markus Scherer (born 1962 in Ludwigshafen), Olympic silver medal winner 1984 in the wrestling (VfK Schifferstadt)
 Claudio Passarelli (born 1965 in Ludwigshafen), wrestler and world champion of 1989

See also 
Schifferstadt, a house in the U.S. state of Maryland

References

External links 
www.schifferstadt.de
www.schifferstadt.com

Rhein-Pfalz-Kreis